Susan Mary Wilkinson (19 October 1943 – 4 January 2005), known professionally as Sue Wilkinson, was a British singer-songwriter. She is best remembered for "You Gotta Be A Hustler If You Wanna Get On" (1980), her sole hit on UK Singles Chart which was promoted by an appearance on the BBC's flagship music programme, Top of The Pops.

Career 
Wilkinson appeared on Top of The Pops on the show of 28 August 1980, to perform her self-penned hit "You Gotta Be A Hustler If You Wanna Get On". Don Powell of the band Slade appeared on the drums. The single, released on the Cheapskate label, reached No. 25 in the UK Singles Chart. Sue Wilkingson presneted a show on Raidersfm in 1988 co presenting before she left in 89

Wilkinson also worked as an actress and model under the name of Sue England.

Wilkinson later moved to Nashville and had success as a jingle writer.

Her book, Reflections of a Recovering Bimbo, was published in 2002.

Musical works

Albums
Looking for Cover (LP) on Hustler label in UK; catalogue no: SUW001 in 1980 
Hot Tea – Mood Swings (mp3) on Tyneville label in USA; catalogue no: 1617 in 2001

Singles
"You Gotta Be A Hustler If You Wanna Get On"//"Double Dealin' Day" P/S Cheapskate CHEAP2 1980 (UK No. 25)
"Posers"//"Hollywood sheik" P/S Cheapskate CHEAP9 1980 
"Time 'N' Tide"//"I'll take what you want to give" P/S Cheapskate CHEAP17 1981 
"Women Only"//"Rich man's son" P/S Cheapskate CHEAP26 1981 
"Toy Boys"//"Extra Marital affair" P/S Hustler SUW002 1987

Singles as songwriter
"Toy Boys"//"Bad Loser" Deauville STL7 1982 – recorded by Julie Walters

Singles as co-songwriter
"Victim of the Planets"//"Dippers delight" Hansa 103-439-100 1981 Germany – recorded by Big Dipper & The Heavenly Bodies

Personal life
She died in January 2005 of breast cancer at the St.John's Hospice in N.W.London.

She was a friend and colleague of the actress Sally Farmiloe, who appeared on the Wilkinson-co-penned hit "Victim of the Planets".

References

External links
 Official Chart Company
 Yes It's Number One

1943 births
2005 deaths
English women singer-songwriters
20th-century English singers
20th-century English women singers